Selby Attree Horne Ash (1836 – 8 September 1870) was an English cricketer. He played one first-class match for Cambridge University Cricket Club in 1858.

Ash was educated at Tonbridge School and Jesus College, Cambridge. He graduated from Cambridge University with a Bachelor of Arts degree in 1859, and was curate of Hadleigh, Suffolk from 1861 to 1863.

See also
 List of Cambridge University Cricket Club players

References

External links
 

1836 births
1870 deaths
English cricketers
Cambridge University cricketers
People from Ditchling
People educated at Tonbridge School
Alumni of Jesus College, Cambridge
19th-century English Anglican priests